Oh My God is the fifth full-length comedy special performed by comedian Louis C.K. It premiered on HBO on April 13, 2013. The special was filmed in Phoenix, Arizona at the Celebrity Theatre.

The special was nominated for four Emmy awards, winning in the Outstanding Writing For A Variety Special category.

C.K. re-released the DVD, video and audio album for download and streaming on his website in April 2020.

Track listing

Critical reception 

The special received generally positive critical reviews. Kyle Ryan, writing for The A.V. Club, said: "To put it succinctly: Louis C.K. seems unstoppable right now. And Oh My God only reinforces that perception." Robert Lloyd, reviewer from the Los Angeles Times, said: "His HBO show starts slow, but his views of mortality are more funny and his fixation on 'horrible thoughts' still more so. Still, it's no 'Louie.'"

The special holds a 90 on Metacritic, based on 5 reviews.

References 

2013 live albums
2013 video albums
2010s comedy albums
Stand-up comedy albums
2013 comedy films
2010s spoken word albums
Films directed by Louis C.K.
Louis C.K. albums
Spoken word albums by American artists
Stand-up comedy concert films
2010s English-language films